A by-election was held for the Australian House of Representatives seat of Lowe on 13 March 1982. This was triggered by the resignation of former Liberal Party Prime Minister and MP Sir William McMahon.

The by-election was won by Labor Party candidate Michael Maher.

The election occurred during the Franklin Dam controversy in Tasmania, which had broad national support; 12% of voters wrote 'No Dams' on their ballot papers.

Results

Sir William McMahon resigned.

See also
 List of Australian federal by-elections

References

1982 elections in Australia
New South Wales federal by-elections